Eric Montes Arce (born 17 April 1998) is a Spanish professional footballer who plays as either a central defender or a central midfielder for Gimnàstic de Tarragona, on loan from Albacete Balompié.

Club career
Born in Manresa, Barcelona, Catalonia, Montes joined FC Barcelona's youth setup in 2008, from Club Gimnàstic Manresa. On 27 July 2017, after finishing his formation, he joined Girona FC and was assigned to the reserves in Segunda División B.

Montes made his senior debut on 20 August 2017, starting in a 0–1 home loss against RCD Mallorca. His first goal came on 21 January of the following year, as he scored the opener in a 1–1 draw at Lleida Esportiu.

Montes made his professional debut on 31 October 2018; coming on as a second-half substitute for injured Douglas Luiz, he scored a last-minute equalizer in a 2–2 away draw against Deportivo Alavés, for the season's Copa del Rey. It was his maiden appearance with the main squad during the campaign, which ended in relegation for both first and B-teams.

On 9 August 2019, Montes signed for Cultural y Deportiva Leonesa in the third division. After two seasons as a starter, he moved to fellow league team Albacete Balompié on 11 June 2021.

After helping Alba in their promotion to Segunda División, Montes was loaned to Gimnàstic de Tarragona in the third tier on 23 August 2022.

References

External links

Living people
1998 births
Footballers from Manresa
Spanish footballers
Association football defenders
Primera Federación players
Segunda División B players
CF Peralada players
Girona FC players
Cultural Leonesa footballers
Albacete Balompié players
Gimnàstic de Tarragona footballers